GE Lighting is a division of Savant Systems Inc. headquartered in Nela Park, East Cleveland, Ohio, United States. The company traces its origins to Thomas Edison's work on lighting in the 19th century.

History
In 1911, General Electric was found to have acquired three quarters of the National Electric Light Association, an association of lighting product companies through which GE had licensed its patented products; this trading arrangement was the subject of an antitrust investigation, and as a result the association was dissolved. GE subsequently acquired several of the association's member companies. These were later consolidated with the Edison lamp division.

In July 2011, GE Lighting entered a licensing agreement with Nuventix for its LED cooling technology and invested $10 million into the company. Two weeks later, the company announced its plans to buy Lightech, acquiring its LED and halogen power supplies, for a deal reportedly worth between $15 million and $20 million. On October 7, 2015, the Commercial division of GE Lighting was separated from the business and a new startup, Current, was created.

On July 1, 2020, GE Lighting was acquired by Savant Systems, a home automation company.

See also
 Chicago Lighting Institute

References

External links

American brands
Lighting brands
Electronics companies established in 1911
American companies established in 1911
Manufacturing companies based in Ohio
Former General Electric subsidiaries
East Cleveland, Ohio
2020 mergers and acquisitions